871 Amneris is a minor planet orbiting the Sun. It is the namesake of the Amneris family, a subgroup of the Flora family of Main Belt asteroids.

This asteroid was named after Amneris, a character in Giuseppe Verdi's Aida.

References

External links
 Asteroid 871 Amneris, Small Bodies Data Ferret
 
 

000871
000871
Discoveries by Max Wolf
Named minor planets
Giuseppe Verdi
19170514